The 2017–18 Basketball Champions League was the second season of the Basketball Champions League (BCL), a European-wide professional basketball competition for clubs, that was launched by FIBA. The competition began on 19 September 2017, with the qualifying rounds, and concluded on 6 May 2018, including 20 domestic champions. 

The Final Four, which was held 4–6 May, was hosted at the Olympic Indoor Hall in Athens, Greece. Hosts AEK Athens won their first Champions League title after defeating Monaco in the final. UCAM Murcia finished in third place while MHP Riesen Ludwigsburg was fourth.

Format changes
For the 2017–18 season, the league went back to the initial format of the 2016–17 season, which includes a regular season of four groups of eight teams, followed by a knock-out stage. 24 teams will be qualified directly, while eight teams will come from the three qualifying rounds that will be implemented. In the Round of 16 and quarterfinals, two-legged series will be played, and the season will be capped off with the Final Four.

Eligibility of players
FIBA agreed to adopt eligibility rules, forcing the clubs to have at least 5 home-grown players in rosters of 11 or 12 players, or at least four, if the team has got less players.

Team allocation
A total of 56 teams (of which 20 were champions) from 32 countries participated in the 2017–18 Basketball Champions League.

Teams
The labels in the parentheses show how each team qualified for the place of its starting round (TH: Basketball Champions League title holders; FEC: FIBA Europe Cup title holders):
1st, 2nd, 3rd, 4th, 5th, etc.: League position after eventual Playoffs
RW: Regular season winners
CW: Cup winners

Notes

Round and draw dates
The schedule of the competition is as follows (all draws are held at the FIBA headquarters in Mies, Switzerland, unless stated otherwise):

Qualifying rounds

The draw for the qualifying rounds was held on 11 July 2017, at the FIBA headquarters in Mies, Switzerland.

In the qualifying rounds, teams are divided into seeded and unseeded teams, based on their club coefficients, and then drawn into two-legged home-and-away ties. Teams from the same country cannot be drawn against each other. However, 19 of 24 losing teams enter the 2017–18 FIBA Europe Cup regular season.

First qualifying round
A total of 16 teams played in the first qualifying round. The first legs were played on 19 September, and the second legs were played on 21 September 2017.

|}

Second qualifying round
A total of 16 teams played in the second qualifying round: eight teams which enter in this round, and the eight winners of the first qualifying round. The first legs were played on 24 September, and the second legs were played on 26 September 2017.

|}

Third qualifying round
A total of 16 teams played in the third qualifying round: Eight teams which enter in this round, and the eight winners of the second qualifying round. The first legs was played on 29 September, and the second legs were played on 2 October 2017.

|}

Regular season

The draw for the regular season was held on 11 July 2017, at the FIBA headquarters in Mies, Switzerland.

The 32 teams are drawn into four groups of eight, with the restriction that teams from the same country cannot be drawn against each other. In each group, teams play against each other home-and-away, in a round-robin format. The group winners, runners-up, third-placed teams and fourth-placed teams, advance to the round of 16, while the fifth-placed teams and sixth-placed teams enter the 2017–18 FIBA Europe Cup round of 16.

A total of 32 teams play in the regular season: 24 teams which enter in this stage, and the 8 winners of the third qualifying round. The match-days will be on 10–11 October, 17–18 October, 24–25 October, 31 October–1 November, 7–8 November, 14–15 November, 5–6 December, 12–13 December, 19–20 December 2016, 9–10 January, 16–17 January, 23–24 January, 30–31 January and 6–7 February 2017.

Group A

Group B

Group C

Group D

Playoffs

In the playoffs, teams play against each other over two legs on a home-and-away basis, except for the Final Four. In the playoffs draw, the group winners and the runners-up are seeded, and the third-placed teams and the fourth-placed teams are unseeded. The seeded teams are drawn against the unseeded teams, with the seeded teams hosting the second leg. Teams from the same group cannot be drawn against each other.

Bracket

Round of 16
The first legs were played on 6–7 March, and the second legs on 13–14 March 2018.

Quarterfinals
The first legs were played on 27–28 March, and the second legs were played on 3–4 April 2018.

Final Four

The concluding Final Four tournament will be played on 4–6 May 2018. The drawing of the pairings took place on 12 April 2018. On 5 April, the O.A.C.A. Olympic Indoor Hall in Athens, Greece was announced as the venue of the 2018 Final Four.

Awards

Most Valuable Player

Final Four MVP

Star Lineup

Best Young Player

Best Coach

Game Day MVP

After each gameday a selection of five players with the highest efficiency ratings is made by the Basketball Champions League. Afterwards, the official website decides which player is crowned Game Day MVP.

Regular season

Round of 16

See also
2017–18 EuroLeague
2017–18 EuroCup Basketball
2017–18 FIBA Europe Cup

References

External links
Basketball Champions League (official website)
FIBA (official website)

 
Basketball Champions League